Ngataua Omahuru was a Māori lawyer. He and his family lived in Mawhitiwhiti near Mount Taranaki in New Zealand's North Island.

Background
In 1869, when Omahuru was five years old, he was kidnapped during the battle of Te Ngutu o te Manu by Maori loyalists and taken to Whanganui. He was later adopted by William Fox, who later became the Premier of New Zealand. Fox changed Omahuru's name to William Fox Jr. and sent him to school in Wellington. He later sent him to live and work with the lawyer, Walter Buller. Omahuru became New Zealand's first Maori lawyer and eventually worked with his adoptive father, William Fox, on the Taranaki Land Commission.

See also
List of kidnappings

References

1860s births
1860s missing person cases
19th-century New Zealand lawyers
Children of prime ministers of New Zealand
Formerly missing people
Kidnapped children
Kidnapped New Zealand people
Missing person cases in New Zealand
New Zealand Māori lawyers
Year of birth unknown
Year of death missing